Kaliyalla Kalyanam is a 1968 Indian Malayalam-language film, directed by A. B. Raj and produced by T. P. Madhavan Nair. The film stars Sathyan, Sharada, Sukumari and Jayabharathi in the lead roles. The film had musical score by A. T. Ummer.

Cast 

Sathyan
Sharada
Sukumari
Jayabharathi
Adoor Bhasi
Manavalan Joseph
B. K. Mulloorkkara
Bahadoor
Dorai
Kumaran
Meena
K. S. Parvathy
S. P. Pillai
Sachu

Soundtrack 
The music was composed by A. T. Ummer and the lyrics were written by Dr. Balakrishnan and P. Bhaskaran.

References

External links 
 

1968 films
1960s Malayalam-language films